The American Society for Church Growth (ASCG) is an international organization which provides a professional network for those individuals or organizations associated with the Church Growth Movement.  The society was founded in 1986 by Donald McGavran and C. Peter Wagner, and is currently led by president James Cho.  The organization changed its name to the Great Commission Research Network in 2009.

Profile
The ASCG defines church growth as follows:

Church growth is that careful discipline which investigates the nature, the function, and the health of Christian churches, as they relate to the effective implementation of the Lord's Great Commission to make disciples of all peoples (Matthew 28:19-20). It is a spiritual conviction, yet it is practical, combining the eternal principles of God's Word with the practical insights of social and behavioral sciences.

In 1991 the ASCG began publishing the Journal of the American Society for Church Growth (JASCG) annually, and in 1997 this became thrice yearly. This Journal has recently been renamed to the Great Commission Research Journal and is published by Biola University twice yearly.  The journal is currently edited by Alan McMahan.  The society also hosts an annual conference.

Past Presidents
Past presidents include:
C. Peter Wagner (founding president)
George Hunter III
Kent R. Hunter
Elmer Towns
Eddie Gibbs
Bill Sullivan
Carl F. George
Flavil Yeakley, Jr.
John Vaughan
Gary L. McIntosh
R. Daniel Reeves
Ray Ellis
Charles VanEngen
Charles Arn
Alan McMahan
Bob Whitesel
Steve Wilkes
Mike Morris

References

External links
 

Evangelical parachurch organizations